Desipramine is the second studio album by Waiting for God, released in 1997 by Synthetic Symphony.

Reception
Aiding & Abetting gave Desipramine a positive review, calling it "much edgier sound than the first album" and saying "the change in sophistication and general adventurousness is impressive." Larry Dean Miles at Black Monday was somewhat critical of the album, saying "there are no hooks, the vocals are grating, and the rhythms are erratic in their pulsating monotony" but "the female vocal arrangements of Daemon Cadman are the saving grace to the monotony of Waiting for God's" Sonic Boom praised the band for being able "to push the envelope of their own music by incorporating noise concepts into their already unique pseudo-Darkwave style ultimately yielding another new hybrid sound."

Track listing

Personnel
Adapted from the Desipramine liner notes.

Waiting for God
 Daemon Cadman – lead vocals
 Martin Myers – guitar, keyboards, programming, production, mixing, editing (1, 9, 10)
 Greg Price – drums, production, mixing (1, 9, 10), editing

Additional performers
 Michael Balch – sampler (4)
 Bill Briscall – bass guitar (9)
 Jay Byiak – guitar (2, 3, 5)
 Eric Chalmers – guitar (1, 2, 5)

Production and design
 Ken Marshall – mixing (2-8)

Release history

References

External links 
 

1997 albums
Waiting for God (band) albums
Re-Constriction Records albums
Synthetic Symphony albums